The USC Aiken Pacers are the athletic teams that represent the University of South Carolina Aiken, located in Aiken, South Carolina, in intercollegiate sports at the Division II level of the National Collegiate Athletic Association (NCAA). The Pacers have primarily competed in the Peach Belt Conference since the 1990–91 academic year. The Pacers' primary rival is conference foe Augusta.

USC Aiken competes in ten intercollegiate varsity sports. Men's sports include baseball, basketball, cross country, golf, and soccer; while women's sports include basketball, cross country, soccer, softball, and volleyball. Men's and women's tennis were discontinued at the end of the 2018–19 school year.

The school's sports teams were initially known as the Rebels.  The mascot name was changed to Pacers in 1971.

Conference affiliations 
NCAA
 Peach Belt Conference (1990–present)

Varsity teams

Baseball 
The Pacer baseball program is led by second-year head coach Michael Holder. Holder succeeded longtime coach Kenny Thomas, who led the Pacers to nine NCAA Southeast Regional appearances across 22 seasons as head coach.

Men's basketball 
The men's basketball program has been led by Mark Vanderslice since the 2015–16 season.

Women's basketball 
The women's basketball program has been led by Mark Miller since the 2016–17 season.

Cross country 
The Pacers' cross country program is led by coach Marshall Leonard.

Golf 
The Pacers' golf program has been led by coach Michael Carlisle since the 1991–92 season. During his tenure, the program has experienced unprecedented success, including a run of three consecutive national championships (2004, 2005, and 2006).

Men's soccer 
The men's soccer program is led by coach Ike Ofoje, who was also the Pacers' inaugural women's soccer head coach.

Women's soccer 
The women's soccer program is led by second-year head coach Tina Murphy. Under her direction, the Pacers experienced their first winning season since the 2000 season.

Softball 
The Pacers' softball program is led by third-year head coach Jaclin Poole. Under Poole's leadership, the Pacers made the 2022 Peach Belt Conference tournament, the program's first since 2016.

Volleyball 
The Pacers' volleyball program is led by head coach Glenn Cox, who has guided the program since 2008.

Conference championships
As members of the Peach Belt Conference the Pacers have won 55 conference championships (46 team, nine individual) across five programs.

Men's Sports
Baseball
 PBC Regular Season - 3 (1994, 2009, 2013)
 PBC Tournament - 2 (1992, 1993)

Basketball
 PBC Regular Season - 6 (1992-93, 2007-08, 2011-12, 2012-13, 2013-14, 2022-23)
 PBC Tournament - 4 (1993, 2010, 2013, 2014)

Golf
 PBC Championships - 12 (1995, 1996, 1997, 2002, 2003, 2005, 2006, 2008, 2013, 2014, 2017, 2018)
 PBC Individual Champions - 9 (Brian Kassel '93, Jamie Stanley '95, '97, Brooks Blackburn '96, Scott Brown '02, '06, Dane Burkhart '05, Brandon Robinson-Thompson '14, Johnson Holliday '18)

Women's Sports
Basketball
 PBC Regular Season - 3 (1990-91, 2001-02, 2007-08)
 PBC Tournament - 1 (2012)

Volleyball
 PBC Regular Season - 10 (1991, 1992, 1993, 1995, 2006, 2007, 2015, 2016, 2018, 2019)
 PBC Tournament - 5 (1991, 1992, 1996, 2006, 2007)

Regional championships
The Pacers have had consistent success in regional competition, claiming 15 (10 team, five individual) NCAA Division II Region Titles across five sports.

Team

Individual

National championships

Team

Individual

Notable alumni

Baseball 
Rich Batchelor, (1986–89)
Scott Cassidy, (1994–95)
Paul Fletcher, (1986–87)
Roberto Hernández, (1986)
Adam Riggs, (1993–94)
Bryan Ward, (1993)
Reggie Williams, (1987–88)

Men's basketball 
 Chris Commons, (2007–09)
 Josh Dollard, (2008–09)

Men's golf 
Matt Atkins, (2010–13)
Scott Brown, (2001–05)
Roberto Díaz, (2005–08)

Men's soccer 
 Ranaldo Bailey, (2018–19)
 John Lesko, (2006–08)

Women's soccer 
 Akeyla Furbert, (2012–15)

References

External links